"(Ha Ha) Slow Down" is the first single from Fat Joe's tenth studio album The Darkside Vol. 1. The song features rapper Young Jeezy. It also contains a short sample of Soul II Soul's "Back to Life (However Do You Want Me)" (a capella version)  throughout the entire beat.

Remixes
Several rappers have recorded freestyles over the song's instrumental, including The Lox, Talib Kweli, Shyne, Jae Millz, Game, Rick Ross, Nipsey Hussle, Capone-N-Noreaga, Raekwon, Uncle Murda, Jim Jones, Rayne Storm and French Montana. More elements of "Back to Life (However Do You Want Me)" are sampled on Maino's version.

Music video
The music video was produced by Parris and features a cameo by Diddy, Trina, Waah (Ruff Ryders Entertainment CEO) & Al Harrington (professional NBA player from the Denver Nuggets).

Charts

References

2009 songs
2010 singles
Fat Joe songs
Jeezy songs
Song recordings produced by Scoop DeVille
Songs written by Fat Joe
Songs written by Jeezy
Songs written by Jazzie B
MNRK Music Group singles